Niles East High School was a public 4–year school in Skokie, Illinois. Operated by Niles Township High Schools District 219, Niles East was first opened in 1938 and closed after the 1979–1980 school year. Niles East's sister schools Niles West High School and Niles North High School remain open. The school was known as Niles Township High School until Niles West High School opened in 1959.  The school sports teams were named the Trojans. The school's greatest claims to fame are its two Nobel Laureate alumni—perhaps even more notable because the school was open for only 42 years. It ranks high among schools around the world on the list "Nobel Prize laureates by secondary school affiliation." The school buildings were demolished by Oakton Community College.

History
In 1975 Niles Township High School District 219 announced that Niles East would be closed in 1980 and all students and faculty were moved to Niles West and Niles North. On the evening of November 2, 1978, then President Jimmy Carter attended a "Get out the Vote" Rally at Niles East, where he was given an honorary diploma from the school.

After closure
After Oakton Community College moved from their original Morton Grove campus to Des Plaines, Oakton opened a branch campus in the former Niles East building. District 219 administrative offices were temporarily located in the shuttered Niles East. Centre East for the Performing Arts was located in the former Niles East Auditorium until their current facility opened near Golf Road and Skokie Boulevard. Oakton Community College demolished the original high school buildings in stages as new buildings opened. The only remaining structures of Niles East as of 2017 are the courtyard flagpole and the basement under the gymnasium that is now used for storage.

Pop culture
After its closing in 1980, exterior and interior shots of the school were used in scenes from films such as Risky Business (1983) and the John Hughes films Sixteen Candles (1984), Weird Science (1985), and Pretty in Pink (1986).

School Songs

Fight Song
Nilehi, Nilehi,
Go out and win this game,
We'll help you try.
The Trojans were a mighty race,
They fought with lots of vim.
Let's keep our fighting spirit and we'll win!
Let's go now!
Gold and Blue,
We're true to you,
We'll stand behind you always to a man.
Let's keep our colors flying high,
Our motto is to do or die,
Let's win this game, Nilehi!
Let's go, Nilehi!
Let's go, Trojans!
Fight hard, Nilehi!
VICTORY IS OURS!!

Alma Mater
Gold and Blue

Gold and Blue we sing to you
To you we bring our hearts so true
When we go off to College, we will think of you old school
Where we gained lots of knowledge and learned the golden rule
Though years may come and years may go
Deep in our hearts we'll always know
That there's only one real high school
And so we sing anew
We love you Gold and Blue

Athletics
Niles East competed as a member of the Central Suburban League from 1972 until its closing in 1980.  It was always a member of the Illinois High School Association (IHSA), which governs most athletic competition in Illinois. The IHSA currently recognizes Niles West High School as the caretaker of Niles East's competitive history. The following teams finished in the top four of their respective IHSA state championship tournament:
 Baseball:  2nd place (1957–58)
 Gymnastics (boys): 4th place (1961–62, 1967–68, 1974–75);  3rd place (1968–69);  2nd place (1962–63, 1963–64)
 Swimming & Diving (boys):  4th place (1952–53)
 Tennis (boys):  3rd place (1960–61)
 Wrestling: 2nd place (1960–61)
 Fencing: 1st place - State Champion Team (1969–70)

Notable alumni
 Robert Horvitz (class of 1964) was the co–recipient of the 2002 Nobel Prize in Physiology or Medicine for discoveries concerning genetic regulation of organ development and programmed cell death.
 Martin Chalfie (class of 1965) was the co–recipient of the 2008 Nobel Prize in Chemistry for the discovery and development of the green fluorescent protein, GFP.
 William Campbell (class of 1949) U.S. Air Force lieutenant general.
 David Kaplan (class of 1978) ESPN 1000 radio sportscaster and host of Sports Talk Live on Comcast SportsNet Chicago.
 William Nack (class of 1959) author of best seller Secretariat, consultant to and bit part in the movie, and Ruffian, also made into a movie.  Political/government reporter for Long Island Newsday and later senior editor for Sports Illustrated.
 Jill Wine-Banks (class of 1961?) television news legal commentator, Watergate prosecutor, first woman executive director of the American Bar Association. first woman general counsel of the U.S. Army.

References

External links
Niles Township High School District 219
Niles East Alumni Directory
Oakton Community College
Centre East for the Performing Arts
Schools of Skokie, Illinois 1900-1996 - Skokie Historical Society
Illinois High School "Glory Days"
"Teacher's Strike" 1976 documentary film 

Educational institutions established in 1938
Educational institutions disestablished in 1980
Former high schools in Illinois
High schools in Skokie, Illinois
1938 establishments in Illinois